Haljand Udam (May 8, 1936 – December 17, 2005) was an Estonian orientalist and translator.

Early life and career
Udam was born in Rakvere in 1936 and graduated from Tartu University as a geologist, but soon became interested in Eastern culture, including Ancient Iranian literature. He studied oriental languages in Tashkent university and Moscow State University Initially specializing in Indology, he became interested in traditionalist philosophers like Guénon. In Moscow, Udam defended his candidate's thesis in 1971 (“On the Special Semantic Aspects of the Persian Sufi Terminology”). Udam has translated several works from Arabic (Ibn Tufail), Persian (Rudaki, Saadi, Ali Safi), Urdu, Tajik, and other languages into Estonian, including Omar Khayyam's Rubaiyat. He also worked as an editor and contributed to Estonian Encyclopedia (Eesti Entsüklopeedia).

Some of his articles on orientalism have also been published in foreign language magazines. Just before his death, Udam managed to finish the translation of Quran into the Estonian language. It was published on the 19 December 2007. Udam was also known as one of the few Estonian intellectuals who aligned with the Conservative Revolution.

Udam was the leading scholar of Islam in Estonia. He died in Viterbo, Italy in 2005.

Footnotes

References

Haljand Udam in memoriam http://www.ekspress.ee/viewdoc/A99CF9B6F0552EC5C22570DD003C25C0
Haljand Udam - inimene kõrvalteelt, Arter, April 22, 2000 https://web.archive.org/web/20080109084947/http://arhiiv2.postimees.ee:8080/leht/00/04/22e/lugu12.htm

Bibliography

Orienditeekond, Tallinn 2001,  (see a review http://20th-century-history-books.com/B0008DAQUI.html)

External links
https://web.archive.org/web/20070623230402/http://www.eao.ee/01tekstid/intervjuu_udam.html (Interview with Udam, in Estonian)

1936 births
2005 deaths
Estonian academics
Estonian translators
Quran translators
University of Tartu alumni
Academic staff of Moscow State University
Estonian orientalists
Translators to Estonian
Translators from Arabic
Translators from Persian
Translators from Urdu
20th-century translators
People from Rakvere
Recipients of the Order of the White Star, 5th Class